Tuukka Mikael Rask (born 10 March 1987) is a Finnish former professional ice hockey goaltender. Rask was drafted 21st overall in the 2005 NHL Entry Draft by the Toronto Maple Leafs before being traded to the Boston Bruins in 2006, where he played his entire 15 season NHL career. He is regarded by many as the best goaltender in Boston Bruins history, one of the best Finnish goaltenders of all time, and one of the greatest goaltenders in NHL history. His strong goaltending has been credited with helping establish the Boston Bruins as a defensive powerhouse throughout the 2010s.

Rask was among the league's most successful goaltenders during his tenure with the Bruins. He won the Stanley Cup with the Bruins in 2011, and led the Bruins to the Stanley Cup Finals on two more occasions in 2013 and 2019. He also won the Vezina Trophy as the league's top goaltender during the 2013–14 season, and was a finalist for the 2019-20 award. He also won the William M. Jennings Trophy along with goaltender Jaroslav Halák in the 2019–20 season. In addition to that, Rask is also a two-time NHL All-Star team member. He led team Finland to bronze medals over team USA at the 2006 World Juniors, where he was also awarded the honor of Best Goaltender. He led them to another bronze medal against the United States at the 2014 Winter Olympics. Tuukka is the older brother of Joonas Rask, who plays professionally as a forward with Luleå HF in the SHL.

At the time of his retirement, Tuukka Rask was among the best statistical goaltenders of all time. He holds the Boston Bruins record for regular season games played (564) and wins (308), as well as the playoff record for games played (104) and wins (57). He is third in save percentage all-time (0.92103) (first in the salary cap era), third in goals against average (GAA) among goaltenders in the modern era (2.28) (first in the salary cap era), and eleventh in goals saved above average (GSAA) all time (149.934). In the playoffs, Rask is fourth in save percentage (0.92517), ninth in GAA (2.22), and twelfth in GSAA (41.676). Rask also holds the NHL record for most consecutive playoff games above the 0.900 save percentage mark, eclipsing 23 games during the 2019 Stanley Cup Playoffs. He is the only goaltender in modern NHL history to have not lost a Conference Finals game playing at least two series, posting an 8-0 record with 3 shutouts, a GAA of 0.82, and a save percentage of 0.972. In addition to his NHL achievements, Rask is also among the top Finnish and European goaltenders of all time. He is first in both save percentage and GAA amongst Finnish goaltenders, second in shutouts, and fourth in wins. Among European goaltenders, Rask is second only to Dominik Hašek in save percentage, fourth in GSAA, and fifth in shutouts (52).

Tuukka Rask was considered to be a true hybrid goaltender known for his economy of motion. He was best known for playing a very positionally sound game, where he would absorb the puck into his chest rather than reaching for it with his hands. He employed a narrow butterfly and he stayed on his skates to make high saves, rather than dropping to his knees. His style incorporates a low and wide stance, a unique shin-lock RVH positioning, and effective rebound control. The shin-lock RVH (reverse vertical-horizontal) was a staple in his game during his early seasons as well as later in his career due to hip issues, which ultimately ended his career after an attempted comeback in 2022.

In addition to his play, Rask was well known for his on-ice antics, such as throwing a milk crate, forgetting the score, and the skate blade incident.

Playing career

Finland
Rask started his career in the youth teams of his hometown club SaPKo in Savonlinna, Finland. He then played in 26 games for the Tampere-based Ilves Jr. in the Finnish Junior League. His goals against average (GAA) was 1.86 with two shutouts and a .935 save percentage. He was the top-ranked European goaltender in the 2005 NHL Entry Draft.

Rask played his last European ice hockey season as the number one goaltender for the Ilves senior team in the Finnish top-flight SM-liiga.

The Toronto Maple Leafs drafted Rask in the first round, 21st overall, in the 2005 NHL Entry Draft. However, before playing a regular season game for Toronto, he was traded to the Boston Bruins in exchange for former Calder Memorial Trophy-winning goaltender Andrew Raycroft. Toronto management had deemed Justin Pogge their potential goaltender of the future, rendering Rask expendable. It was later revealed the Bruins intended to release Raycroft, which would have made him available to Toronto without having to give up Rask.

The trade has since been examined as one of the worst trades in Maple Leafs franchise history; Rask would experience many seasons of success with the Bruins, eventually winning the Stanley Cup and Vezina Trophy, while Raycroft would only play two seasons for Toronto, recording disappointing statistics in the process.

Boston Bruins

Backup and emergence (2007–2012)

On 5 May 2007, Rask signed a three-year contract with the Boston Bruins and was in attendance to observe the Providence Bruins' 2006–07 playoff run for the American Hockey League (AHL)'s Calder Cup championship. The Providence team did not make it past the second round of the Calder Cup against the Manchester Monarchs, but nonetheless Rask practiced with the Providence team.

On 5 November 2007, Rask was called up to the Boston Bruins for the first time. Just two weeks later, on 20 November, he recorded his first NHL win, a 4–2 victory on the road against his former team, the Toronto Maple Leafs. On 3 October 2008, the Bruins reassigned Rask to Providence. Rask had the best save percentage (.952) among the goalies in pre-season play, followed by teammates Manny Fernandez (.875), Tim Thomas (.869) and Kevin Regan (.857). Despite this, the team opted to go with the two veteran goaltenders, Thomas and Fernandez, for the 2008–09 season.

With nagging back spasms keeping Fernandez from play shortly after the All-Star Game break, Rask was once again called up to serve as a second goaltender, and on 31 January 2009, he played his first (and only) game with the Bruins in the 2008–09 season, and earned his first ever NHL shutout, a 1–0 home effort against the New York Rangers, with Marc Savard scoring the only Bruins goal.

Not long after the beginning of the 2009–10 season, Rask, who had been named the backup goaltender to Thomas, signed a two-year extension to his contract with the Bruins on 5 November that kept him under contract through to the 2011–12 season.

In the 2009–10 regular season, Rask was the only goaltender in the NHL with a GAA of less than 2.00 and the only goaltender with a save percentage over .930. Despite having been the only qualifying rookie in NHL history to lead the league with a sub-2.00 GAA, as well as lead the league in save percentage, and having supplanted the Vezina Trophy winner Tim Thomas as the starter, Rask was not named as a finalist for the rookie of the year award. In the 2010–11 season, Thomas returned to form, effectively relegating Rask once again to the backup role. With the Bruins winning the Stanley Cup in 2011, Rask became only the second Finnish goaltender to do so, after Antti Niemi of the Chicago Blackhawks accomplished the feat the previous year.

Starter and Vezina trophy season (2012–2017)
On 28 June 2012, Rask re-signed with the Bruins to a one-year, $3.5 million contract. Prior to the declaration of the 2012–13 lockout, Rask was named as the starting goaltender for the Bruins, replacing Tim Thomas, who would eventually be traded to the New York Islanders on 7 February 2013. During the lockout, which ended on 6 January 2013, Rask played for HC Plzeň, which won the Czech Extraliga that year. After the NHL resumed play, Rask led the Bruins to their second Stanley Cup finals in three years in the 2013 playoffs. In the third round against the Pittsburgh Penguins, Rask faced 136 shots in four games played, allowing two goals while making 134 saves for a 0.50 GAA and a .985 save percentage. In the Stanley Cup finals, the Bruins were defeated in six games by the Chicago Blackhawks, as Rask registered a .932 save percentage.

On 10 July 2013, the Bruins re-signed Rask to an eight-year, $56 million contract. Following the conclusion of the 2013–14 season, Rask was awarded the NHL's Vezina Trophy, awarded to the "goalkeeper adjudged to be the best at his position". He posted a 36–15–6 record, highlighted by a career-best ten-game points-won streak from 20 to 30 March, going 9–0–1, as the Bruins captured their first Presidents' Trophy since 1990 and led the Eastern Conference in team defence (2.08 goals allowed per game).

Early in the 2016–17 regular season, Rask sustained a groin injury that somewhat hampered his abilities much of the season following a successful October campaign, starting the 2016–17 season with 12 wins and a .938 save percentage in 17 games. He was likely used more often than usual, with the Bruins suffering from "backup goaltender" challenges early in the season, but not enough of a hindrance to help lead the Bruins to the 2017 playoffs, the Bruins' first in three seasons. Following a six-game quarterfinal series with the Bruins losing to the Ottawa Senators four games to two, Rask successfully underwent groin surgery on 9 May 2017. In mid-August, Rask said he expected to be ready for the Bruins' training camp for the 2017–18 season.

Career milestones and retirement (2017–2022)
In the 2017–18 season, from 26 November 2017 to 10 February 2018, Rask had a career-high 21-game point streak. Rask and the Bruins ended up finishing the season with 50 wins and 112 points, their best season since their 2013–14 Presidents' Trophy-winning season. He played only 54 games, his lowest since that same 2013–14 season, posting a 34–14–5 record with a 2.36 GAA and a .917 save percentage. In the 2018 playoffs, the Bruins were defeated in the second round in five games by the Tampa Bay Lightning, with Rask playing 12 games total in the playoffs and posting a 2.88 GAA and .903 save percentage, his lowest since his first postseason in 2010.

On 1 January 2019, during the 2019 NHL Winter Classic, Rask set a new record for games played by a Bruins goaltender with his 469th game, surpassing Tiny Thompson's record set in the 1938–39 NHL season. However, Rask was later placed on injured reserve by the Bruins on 28 January after sustaining a concussion. At the time of his injury, Rask had a 14–8–3 record in 25 starts. Rask returned to the Bruins lineup on 31 January in a 3–2 overtime loss to the Philadelphia Flyers. It was his first start in a game since 19 January. On 3 February 2019 against the Washington Capitals, Rask recorded a shutout to become the career leader for wins by a goaltender in Bruins history, again surpassing Tiny Thompson.

Rask helped the Bruins to the 2019 Stanley Cup Finals, though they ultimately lost in seven games to the St. Louis Blues. Rask recorded a 15–9 record with a 2.02 goals against average and a .934 save percentage during the 2019 Stanley Cup playoffs.

Rask played his 500th game in the NHL on 22 October 2019, a 4–2 Bruins victory over the Maple Leafs. On 10 March 2020, his 33rd birthday, Rask recorded the 50th shutout of his career, against the Philadelphia Flyers. Due to the COVID-19 pandemic the season was paused and when the NHL announced its return-to-play plan Rask would automatically win the William M. Jennings Trophy along with Jaroslav Halak. On 15 August, during the NHL's Return to Play program, Rask opted to leave the playoffs, exit the "bubble" in Toronto in which teams were quarantined, and return to his family after playing five games in the "bubble", which included two games against the Carolina Hurricanes in the 2020 Stanley Cup playoffs. After the playoffs, he revealed that the reason he left was his daughter going through an undisclosed medical emergency.

On 15 April 2021, Rask would return from an upper-body injury, where he recorded his 300th NHL win against the Islanders. He became the 37th goaltender and the fourth Finnish goaltender to achieve the milestone. Rask also became the fifth-fastest player to reach the milestone, which he achieved in his 552nd NHL game, and also became the first Bruins goaltender to reach the mark. On 21 May, Rask passed Gerry Cheevers for the most postseason wins by a goalie in Bruins history, after Rask won his 54th postseason game against the Washington Capitals in the 2021 Stanley Cup playoffs. Following the game 6 exit of the Bruins from the playoffs, Rask revealed he had been dealing with an early-season injury to an acetabular labrum in one of his hips, necessitating surgery during the summer and a likely return to play for the team. Even with his upcoming free-agency resulting in UFA status by the upcoming season, Rask indicated he had no plans to play as a goaltender for any other team but the Bruins, going forward.

On 6 January 2022, Rask signed an AHL tryout contract with the Providence Bruins of the American Hockey League (AHL), with the intention to rehab from surgery before returning to Boston. However, the games he was slated to start in were postponed due to a COVID-19 outbreak among the Lehigh Valley Phantoms, who were then unable to travel to Providence for the weekend's contests. Despite missing those rehab starts, Rask signed a one-year contract with the Boston Bruins on 11 January, worth $1 million. In his return to the Bruins, Rask started just four games before going back on the injured list. On 9 February, Rask announced his retirement from ice hockey.

International play

Rask played in four of Finland's six games en route to the bronze medal at the 2014 Winter Olympics, including a 3–1 defeat of host nation Russia in the quarter-finals, and a shut-out of the United States in the bronze medal game. He was unable to play in the semifinal against Sweden due to flu, which cost Finland a spot in the final. Sweden defeated Finland 2–1.

On 2 March 2016, it was revealed that Rask was to be the starting goaltender for Finland in the 2016 World Cup of Hockey, ahead of Pekka Rinne. Rask played in two out of three tournament games and in one out of three pre-tournament games.

Off the ice
In 2015, a recently discovered species of wasp in Kenya was named Thaumatodryinus tuukkaraski as a direct reference to Rask. The reasoning given by the authors was, "This species is named after the acrobatic goaltender for the Finnish National ice hockey team and the Boston Bruins, whose glove hand is as tenacious as the raptorial fore tarsus of this dryinid species."

Career statistics

Regular season and playoffs
Bold indicates led league

International

Awards, honors and records

Boston Bruins records
 Most games played by a goaltender in Boston Bruins history.
 Most wins by a goaltender in franchise history.
 Most shutouts in playoff series-clinching games in franchise history.
 Longest season-opening home point streak in Boston Bruins history.
 Most playoff wins by a goaltender in franchise history.

In addition to the above, a newly discovered wasp species, Thaumatodryinus tuukkaraski, was named in Rask's honor in 2015.

References

External links

 
 Tuukka Rask biography at hockeygoalies.org

1987 births
Boston Bruins players
Finnish ice hockey goaltenders
Ice hockey players at the 2014 Winter Olympics
Ilves players
Living people
Medalists at the 2014 Winter Olympics
National Hockey League All-Stars
National Hockey League first-round draft picks
Olympic bronze medalists for Finland
Olympic ice hockey players of Finland
Olympic medalists in ice hockey
People from Savonlinna
Providence Bruins players
Stanley Cup champions
Toronto Maple Leafs draft picks
Vezina Trophy winners
William M. Jennings Trophy winners
Sportspeople from South Savo